Rachel White is a professional dancer. A two-time New Zealand Professional Latin Champion, White was the co-owner of JustDance studio in Los Angeles, and a judge on the television series Dancing With the Stars New Zealand.

Early life
Rachel White was born Rachel Burstein in Tbilisi, USSR, and later moved to the United States at the age of four.

Career
Rachel White is a two-time New Zealand Professional Latin Champion. She is the co-owner of JustDance studio in Los Angeles, and has been ranked as high as the fifth top female dance teacher in the US by Dancesport World Series. As an instructor, she has also assembled classes meant for those with dementia in order to help in their cognitive health.

In 2009 White competed in the television competition Dancing With the Stars New Zealand, where she placed third while partnered with Josh Kronfeld. In 2017 White placed 8th in the Professional Smooth category at the Open British Ballroom Championship in Blackpool. In 2018 White then joined the television judging panel for Dancing With the Stars New Zealand. She returned the following season in order to continue as a judge for the show. As a judge, she has also danced in exhibition numbers shown as a part of the show.

Personal life
White is married to her husband, New Zealand born Stu White.

References

21st-century New Zealand dancers
Living people
Year of birth missing (living people)
Soviet emigrants to the United States